Choline hydroxide is an organic compound with the chemical formula . It is also known as choline base. It is used as solutions in water or alcohols, which are colorless and very alkaline.

Properties
It is hygroscopic and thus often encountered as a colorless viscous hydrated syrup that smells of trimethylamine (TMA). Aqueous solutions of choline are stable, but the compound slowly breaks down to ethylene glycol, polyethylene glycols, and TMA.

Chemistry
Choline hydroxide is a quaternary ammonium salt, consisting of choline cations and hydroxide anions. It is bifunctional compound, meaning, it contains both quaternary ammonium functional group and a hydroxyl functional group. Choline hydroxide forms an ionic liquid.

Occurrence
The cation of this salt, choline, occurs in nature in living beings.

Uses
Choline hydroxide is used in industry as a pH regulating agent and as an eco-friendly, biodegradable, recyclable and efficient catalyst with high yields for synthesis of certain organic compounds (2-amino-3-nitro-4H-chromene derivatives) in an aqueous solution at room temperatures.

Safety
Choline hydroxide irritates skin, eyes and respiratory system. It can cause serious injuries to the eyes. Causes serious skin and eye burns. Inhalation of this chemical may cause dyspnea and corrosive injuries to upper respiratory system and lungs, which can lead to pneumonia. May react violently with strong oxidizing agents.

References 

Hydroxides